The 2010 Guia Race of Macau (formally the 2010 Guia Race of Macau, presented by Sociedade de Jogos de Macau) was the eleventh and final round of the 2010 World Touring Car Championship season and the sixth running of the Guia Race of Macau as a World Touring Car Championship round. It was held at the Guia Circuit on the streets of Macau on 21 November 2010. The race was part of the Macau Grand Prix weekend, headlined by the 2010 Macau Grand Prix Formula Three.

Chevrolet sealed their first manufacturers' championship while Sergio Hernández secured the Yokohama Independents' Trophy for the second time.

Race one was won by polesitter Robert Huff of Chevrolet RML, while Norbert Michelisz took his maiden victory in race two, driving for Zengő-Dension Team.

Background
The drivers' championship was decided after the FIA found the use of sequential gearboxes by BMW Team RBM at the Race of Japan to be illegal and both of their drivers, Andy Priaulx and Augusto Farfus were stripped of all points earned at the event. This meant Yvan Muller of the factory Chevrolet team secured the world drivers' championship title. Outgoing champion Gabriele Tarquini was still defending second in the championship ahead of Priaulx and Huff. Hernández was leading the Yokohama Independents' Trophy which was still to be decided.

Stefano D'Aste opted to miss the final round of the season in order to attend the Monza Rally Show, despite still being in mathematical contention for the Yokohama Trophy title. André Couto joined SR-Sport for the event, driving the car previously raced by Jordi Gené and Michaël Rossi. Local driver Jo Merszei joined Liqui Moly Team Engstler, as did Japanese racer Masaki Kano. Jacob & Co Racing ran a Honda Accord Euro R for Hong Kong driver Philip Ma and Portuguese team Team Novadriver Total ran a BMW 320si for César Campaniço. Another Honda Accord was entered for their driver Kuok Io Keong and Chan Kin Man raced a self–run Honda Civic Type R.

Report

Testing and free practice
Huff topped an interrupted opening test session on Thursday, with team–mate Alain Menu second. New champion Muller was fifth and Couto was the fastest of the local drivers in tenth. The first stoppage occurred just one lap into the session when Chan Kin Man and Andrei Romanov crashed at the Hospital Bend. Then ten minutes from the end, Kano clipped the barriers at the R–Bend to bring out the red flags again.

Huff topped the times in free practice one on Friday, Priaulx was second and Monteiro was third.

Free practice two saw Huff complete his testing and practice domination, topping the times with Muller second and Monteiro third for the second session in a row. The session had been delayed as barrier repairs were required following the preceding support race session with FP2 starting two hours later than scheduled. The session was not stopped at any point, however Mehdi Bennani spun his Wiechers-Sport BMW at R–Bend and Fredy Barth stopped after hitting the barriers at Faraway in his SEAT.

Qualifying
Having led all the practice sessions, Huff went on take pole position in a lengthened qualifying which went into a second day. The first session started on Friday afternoon but almost immediately the red flags came out when Tom Coronel hit the barriers at Fishermen's Bend. Once the barriers were repaired, the session resumed but Priaulx hit the barrier at R–Bend. He broke the front left wheel off his BMW and slowly returned to the pits but the session was stopped again as Kano spun his Engstler BMW at the first corner and was stranded in the middle of the track. Qualifying resumed once again but Kristian Poulsen brought the session to a half for a third time when he collided with the barriers at Paiol with his BMW ending up parked across the track. Scuderia Proteam Motorsport driver Hernández then crashed while trying to avoid Poulsen's stranded car. By this time it was getting dark and when the session restarted Muller set the fastest time with Huff second. Coronel stopped on track and Q1 was brought to a close after running for almost two hours. The race director decided to delay Q2 until the following morning as darkness set in.

After Q2 had taken place on Saturday morning, Huff took pole position and Michelisz qualified second. A race one grid penalty for the Hungarian driver would see Muller start alongside his Chevrolet team–mate on the front row and Menu would make it a Chevrolet 1–2–3. Muller had hit the barrier at Lisboa in the opening minutes while trying to get ahead of Couto. Monteiro was the leading SR–Sport driver by ending up fifth and Farfus was the leading BMW in sixth. Tarquini, Priaulx, Darryl O'Young and Couto completed the top ten.

Warm-Up
Pole sitter Huff was quickest in the Sunday morning warm–up session, O'Young the fastest independent driver.

Race One
Huff led away from pole position followed by Muller while further back there was contact between Priaulx and Couto with both ending up in the barrier at turn one. Couto and Michel Nykjær, who had also been caught up in the incident, both retired while Priaulx limped back to the pits for repairs. As the pack of cars approached Lisboa, Menu outbraked himself and collided with the wall which dropped him from third to fifteenth. The safety came out on the first lap while the cars of Couto and Nykjær were cleared up. After the race was resumed, O'Young was tapped by the SEAT of Coronel, he lost control of his Chevrolet Lacetti and crashed into the wall at Lisboa having also collected Barth. Coronel was handed a drive–through penalty for causing the collision. Three laps from the end, Huff led Muller and Monteiro while Farfus was defending fourth from Tarquini. The BMW driver was eventually passed by the Italian and then by Michelisz. Ho brought out the final safety car when he crashed and his car came to a rest blocking the track. The race ended under the safety car with Huff claiming the victory, Muller second, Monteiro third, Tarquini fourth, Michelisz fifth and Farfus sixth. Menu had hauled himself back up from fifteenth to seventh to beat Yokohama Trophy winner Poulsen.

Race Two
Poulsen started from the reversed grid pole but was passed by Michelisz and Tarquini at the Mandarin curve. Front row starter Menu had stalled and Farfus had dropped down to fourth at the start, he was however able to elevate himself to third at the expense of Poulsen approaching Lisboa. The race was stopped on the first lap when Romanov, O'Young and Nobuteru Taniguchi collided and blocked the track at Police with the rest of the field stuck behind them. Damage sustained in the pileup also forced Barth and Yukinori Taniguchi to retire. The race was restarted behind the safety car with Michelisz leading Tarquini and Farfus. Colin Turkington served a drive–through penalty after his mechanics continued to work on his car after the three-minute board was shown on the grid. Muller and Huff passed Poulsen before Muller let his team–mate pass him in order to catch Farfus. In attempting a pass, Huff knocked Farfus' rear bumper off but was eventually able to pass and started to close in on Tarquini. Farfus dropped down the order further when Muller passed him on lap nine. Kano and Campaniço both crashed out the race. Michelisz led until the end to claim his first WTCC win with Tarquini second and race one winner Huff third. Hernández beat Engstler to finish ninth and claim the Yokohama Trophy title for the second time.

Results

Qualifying

Race 1

Bold denotes Fastest lap.

Race 2

Bold denotes Fastest lap.

Standings after the event

Drivers' Championship standings

Yokohama Independents' Trophy standings

Manufacturers' Championship standings

 Note: Only the top five positions are included for both sets of drivers' standings.

References

Results Booklet PDF at MST Systems

External links
World Touring Car Championship official website

Macau
Guia Race of Macau
2010 in Chinese motorsport